SINPO, an acronym for Signal, Interference, Noise, Propagation, and Overall, is a Signal Reporting Code used to describe the quality of broadcast and  radiotelegraph transmissions. SINPFEMO, an acronym for Signal, Interference, Noise, Propagation, frequency of Fading, dEpth, Modulation, and Overall is used to describe the quality of radiotelephony transmissions.  SINPFEMO code consists of the SINPO code plus the addition of three letters to describe additional features of radiotelephony transmissions. These codes are defined by Recommendation ITU-R Sm.1135, SINPO and SINPFEMO codes.

SINPO code is most frequently used in reception reports written by shortwave listeners. Each letter of the code stands for a specific factor of the signal, and each item is graded on a 1 to 5 scale (where 1 stands for nearly undetectable/severe/unusable and 5 for excellent/nil/extremely strong).

The code originated with the CCIR (a predecessor to the ITU-R) in 1951, and was widely used by BBC shortwave listeners to submit signal reports, with many going so far as to mail audio recordings to the BBC's offices.

SINPO and SINPFEMO are the official signal reporting codes for international civil aviation  and ITU-R.

The use of the SINPO code can be subjective and may vary from person to person. Not all shortwave listeners are conversant with the SINPO code and prefer using plain language instead.

SINPO code explained 

 S (Signal strength)  The relative strength of the transmission.
 I (Interference)  Interference from other stations on the same or adjacent frequencies.
 N (Noise)  The amount of atmospheric or man-made noise.
 P (Propagation)  Whether the signal is steady or fades from time to time.
 O (Overall merit)  An overall score for the listening experience under these conditions.

Each category is rated from 1 to 5 with 1 being 'unusable' or 'severe' and 5 being 'perfect' or 'nil'. MANY raters misunderstand the code and will rate everything either 55555 or 11111 when in reality both extremes are unusual in the extreme.  '55555' essentially means 'perfect reception akin to a local station' while that is occasionally possible, when talking about long-distance short-wave reception, it is almost never the case.

Another common mistake in rating is presenting an 'O' higher than any previously rated element. By definition, a station cannot present 'perfect' reception if there is any Noise or Interference or Fading present. In other words, it is NOT 'perfect local quality' reception if any of those things are present.

SINPFEMO code
An extension of SINPO code, for use in radiotelephony (voice over radio) communications, SINPFEMO is an acronym for Signal, Interference, Noise, Propagation, frequency of Fading, dEpth, Modulation, and Overall.

Examples of SINPO code applied

In responding to a shortwave reception, the SINPO indicates to the transmitting station the overall quality of the reception.

The SINPO code in normal use consists of the 5 rating numbers listed without the letters, as in the examples below:

 54554 – This indicates a relatively clear reception, with only slight interference; however, nothing that would significantly degrade the listening experience.
 33433 – This indicates a signal which is moderately strong, but has more interference, and therefore deterioration of the received signal.

Generally, a SINPO with a code number starting with a 2 or lower would not be worth reporting, unless there is no noise, interference or loss of propagation, since it would be likely the signal would be unintelligible.

Although the original SINPO code established technical specifications for each number (i.e., a number 3 in the P column meant a fixed number of fades per minute), these are rarely adhered to by reporters.  The 'S' meter displays the relative strength of the received RF signal in decibels; however, this should not be used as the sole indication of signal strength, as no two S meters are calibrated exactly alike, and many lower-priced receivers omit the S meter altogether. References to a "SINFO" code may also be found in some literature. In this case, the 'F' stands for Fading, instead of 'P' for Propagation, but the two codes are interchangeable. It was presumed that the average listener would be more familiar with the meaning of "fading" than "propagation". A simple way to ensure the rating applied is useful is to rate the "O" column first based on the intelligibility of the station. If you can understand everything easily, the station will rate a 4 or higher. If you have to work hard, but can understand everything '3' is the appropriate rating. If you cannot understand everything although you put great effort into it, a '2' is appropriate, and if you cannot understand the programming at all '1' is the appropriate rating.

Some listeners may not know how to distinguish between the 'I' which indicates interference from adjacent stations, and the 'N' which describes natural atmospheric or man-made noise; also for some listeners, the rating for 'Propagation' may not be completely understood. As a result of this confusion, many stations suggest the SIO code – a simpler code which makes the limitations noted above not relevant. Despite this, some books and periodicals maintain the SINPO code is the best for DX reporters.

History 

SINPO is said to have evolved from the BBC's RAISO format (full version: RAFISBEMVO, which measured:

See also
Plain language radio checks
QSA and QRK code (for Morse code only)
R-S-T system (for Amateur radio only)
Signal strength and readability report
Circuit Merit (for wired and wireless telephone circuits only, not radiotelephony)
QSL card

References

External links
itu.int: SM.1135 - Sinpo and sinpfemo codes - ITU

Operating signals
International broadcasting